The Minister of Railways was the minister in the government responsible for the New Zealand Railways Department 1895–1981, the New Zealand Railways Corporation 1981–1993, and New Zealand Rail Limited 1990–1993. The portfolio was established in 1895, 15 years after the Railways Department was formed, and was abolished in 1993, when New Zealand Rail Limited was privatised. Today, KiwiRail is answerable to both the Minister of State Owned Enterprises, and the Minister of Transport.

Office-holders

The following MPs have held the office of Minister of Railways:

Key

See also
 Rail transport in New Zealand

References

Further reading

Rail transport in New Zealand
 
Railways
Railways ministries
Transport organisations based in New Zealand